This is a list of international trips made by Chilean President Sebastián Piñera in his second mandate.

Summary of international trips

2018
The following international trips were made by Chilean President Sebastián Piñera in 2018:

2019
The following international trips were made by Chilean President Sebastián Piñera in 2019:

2020
The following international trips were made by Chilean President Sebastián Piñera in 2020:

Future trips

References

Chile, Piñera
Chile, Piñera
Lists of 21st-century trips
Chile diplomacy-related lists
Piñera
Diplomatic visits, Piñera
Presidency of Sebastián Piñera